The 1999 Rado Swiss Open Gstaad was a men's tennis tournament played on outdoor clay courts at the Roy Emerson Arena in Gstaad, Switzerland and was part of the World Series of the 1999 ATP Tour. It was the 54th edition of the tournament and took place from 5 July until 11 July 1999. Eighth-seeded Albert Costa won the singles title.

Finals

Singles

 Albert Costa defeated  Nicolás Lapentti 7–6(7–4), 6–3, 6–4
 It was Costa's 2nd singles title of the year and the 10th of his career.

Doubles

 Donald Johnson /  Cyril Suk defeated  Aleksandar Kitinov /  Eric Taino 7–5, 7–6(7–4)

References

External links
 Official website 
 ATP tournament profile
 ITF tournament edition details

Rado Swiss Open Gstaad
Swiss Open (tennis)
Rado Swiss Open Gstaad
Rado Swiss Open Gstaad